Events from the year 1792 in France.

Incumbents 
Monarch: Louis XVI (until 21 September; monarchy abolished)
The Legislative Assembly (until 21 September)
The National Convention (from 21 September)

Events

March
25 March – The Legislative Assembly agrees that the guillotine should be used for judicial executions.

April
20 April – The Legislative Assembly declares war against Austria, starting the French Revolutionary Wars and War of the First Coalition.
25 April
 Highwayman Nicolas Pelletier becomes the first person executed by guillotine in France, in what becomes the Place de l'Hôtel de Ville in Paris.
 La Marseillaise, the French national anthem, is composed by Claude Joseph Rouget de Lisle.

June
13 June – Prussia declares war against France.
20 June – Demonstration of 20 June 1792.

August

10 August – French Revolution: Insurrection of 10 August 1792 – The Tuileries Palace is stormed and Louis XVI of France is arrested and taken into custody.
20 August – War of the First Coalition: Battle of Verdun – Prussia defeats France, opening a route to Paris.
21 August – Royalist Louis Collenot d'Angremont becomes the first person executed by guillotine for political reasons, in the Place du Carrousel in Paris.

September
2–19 September – 1792 French National Convention election.
2–7 September – French Revolution: September Massacres – Rampaging mobs in Paris slaughter three Roman Catholic bishops and more than 200 priests, together with at least 1,000 criminals.
9 September – 9 September massacres at Versailles.
11 September – Six men steal some of the former French Crown Jewels from a warehouse, where the revolutionary government has stored them.
14 September – Radical antimonarchist Thomas Paine flees from England to France, after being indicted for treason. He is tried in absentia during December and outlawed.
20 September – French Revolutionary Wars: Battle of Valmy – The French revolutionary army defeats the Prussians under the Duke of Brunswick after a 7-hour artillery duel.

21 September – French Revolution: A Proclamation of the abolition of the monarchy by the French Convention goes into effect, and the French First Republic is established, effective the following day.
22 September – French Revolution: The Era of the historical French Republican Calendar begins.

November
6 November – War of the First Coalition: Battle of Jemappes – Austrian armies under the command of Duke Albert of Saxe-Teschen are defeated in Belgium (at this time part of the Austrian Netherlands) by the French Army led by General Charles François Dumouriez.
19 November – The National Convention passes a resolution pledging French support for the overthrow of the governments of other nations.

December
26 December – The trial of Louis XVI of France begins.

Ongoing
French Revolution
French Revolutionary Wars
War of the First Coalition

Full date unknown
 Claude Chappe successfully demonstrates the first semaphore line, between Paris and Lille.
 Barthélemy Catherine Joubert, future general, becomes sub-lieutenant.

Births
21 May – Gaspard-Gustave Coriolis, engineer, scientist
1 August – Pierre Solomon Ségalas d'Etchépare, physician
9 August – Charles-François Lebœuf, sculptor
25 August – Jean-Baptiste Duvergier, lawyer
28 November – Victor Cousin, philosopher

Deaths

1 March – Jean Godin des Odonais, cartographer and naturalist
12 May – Charles Simon Favart, dramatist
29 July – René Nicolas Charles Augustin de Maupeou, Chancellor of France
23 August – Arnaud II de La Porte, statesman (executed)
25 August – Jacques Cazotte, writer (executed)
3 September – Marie Thérèse Louise of Savoy, Princesse de Lamballe, princess, courtier to Marie Antoinette (murdered during the French Revolution)
8 September – Charles d'Abancour, statesman
22 October – Guillaume Le Gentil, astronomer
7 December – Marie Jeanne Riccoboni, novelist
Full date unknown – Nicholas Adam, grammarian

See also

References

1790s in France